Thestorides of Phocaea was a legendary or semi-legendary early Greek poet, one of those to whom the epic Little Iliad was ascribed.

Thestorides figures as a major character in the fictional Life of Homer fraudulently ascribed to Herodotus. According to this, when Homer came to Phocaea Thestorides offered him food and lodging in exchange for the right to record his poetry in writing. Homer had little choice but to accept, and recited to Thestorides the Iliad, the Odyssey and also an epic on local history and legend, Phocais. This story is unique among the ancient legends concerning Homer as it embodies the claim that writing was known in Homer's circle; all other sources state or imply that Homer's poems were transmitted orally to his followers or descendants. The Life adds that Thestorides afterwards moved to Chios, where he performed Homer's poems as if they were his own and became famous. Homer heard rumours of this and eventually travelled to Chios also; Thestorides, threatened with disgrace, left the island hastily.

Bibliography 

Epic poetry collectors
Early Greek epic poets
Ancient Phocaeans